Earth tone is a color scheme with multiple meanings. In its narrowest sense, it refers to "any color containing some brown" – the color of ground or soil (earth). It can also refer to "natural colors" (colors found in nature) such as brown soil, green leaf, cloudy gray sky, as well as the red sun. These palettes can create a warm, nature-friendly atmosphere.

More generally, it refers to "neutral colors", which are muted and flat in an emulation of natural colors. Neutral colors can be created by mixing two complementary colors or combining a pure color with white, black, or gray. Pure-neutral colors include black, white, and all grays, while near-neutral hues include browns, tan, and darker colors.

Many earth tones originate from clay earth pigments, such as umber, ochre, and sienna.

See also 

 Pastel colors

References

Color schemes